Alexander Pavlovich Ermolinskij (born November 11, 1959) is an Ukraninan-Icelandic basketball coach and a former basketball player. He was an assistant coach for Nadezhda Orenburg from 2010 to 2021. He played for both the Soviet Union national basketball team and Icelandic national basketball team.

Early life
Ermolinskij was born in Vologda in the Soviet Union.

Playing career
After playing for Honvéd for two seasons, where he won the Hungarian Cup in 1991, Ermolinskij joined Skallagrímur of the Icelandic Úrvalsdeild karla in 1992.

Ermolinskij joined Grindavík in 1999 and helped the club win the Icelandic Basketball Cup in 2000.

National team career
Early in his career, Ermolinskij played for the Soviet Union national basketball team. In 1997 he received an Icelandic citizenship and subsequently ee was selected for the Icelandic national team that won bronze in the 1997 Games of the Small States of Europe. In total Ermolinskij played 6 games for Iceland.

Personal life
Ermolinskij's younger son, Pavel Ermolinskij, plays for KR, in the Úrvalsdeild karla, and is a member of the Icelandic national basketball team. His older son, Andrei, played two games in the Úrvalsdeild karla for Körfuknattleiksfélag ÍA during the 1998-1999 season.

References

External links 
 Alexander Ermolinskij Úrvalsdeild stats at kki.is
 Alexander Ermolinskiy at fibaeurope.com

1959 births
Living people
Grindavík men's basketball players
Grindavík women's basketball coaches
Alexander Ermolinskij
Alexander Ermolinskij
Alexander Ermolinskij
Alexander Ermolinskij
Skallagrímur men's basketball players
Skallagrímur men's basketball coaches
Alexander Ermolinskij
Ukrainian men's basketball players
Alexander Ermolinskij
Alexander Ermolinskij
Centers (basketball)